Madibogo is a village and rural area in Ratlou Local Municipality in the North West province of South Africa. It is located 40 km out of Delareyville and about 19 km from Setlagole.

References

Populated places in the Ratlou Local Municipality